"Anything Is Possible" is the first single from American singer-songwriter-actress Debbie Gibson's third album of the same title (1990). Written, arranged, and produced by Gibson and Lamont Dozier, LP version was used for the single release worldwide except the United Kingdom and Europe, where an edited version of a remix by Harding and Curnow of PWL Records was used. The single fared relatively well on the US charts, reaching No. 26 on the Billboard Hot 100 in January 1991.

Critical reception
Larry Flick from Billboard wrote, "Grown-up teen diva offers the title track to her fab new album. Mature, understated vocals glide over a glistening pop/disco instrumental base. Remix by Jellybean on the 12-inch accentuates the tune's fun and funky tendencies." Gina Arnold from Entertainment Weekly called it a "high-energy" cut, adding that the song "come close" to being "as infectiously Madonna-esque" as Gibson's 1987 hit "Shake Your Love". Pan-European magazine Music & Media described it as "Madonna-inspired dance pop with a fashionable co-production by Motown veteran Lamont Dozier. Certainly a dancefloor filler, though EHR should pay close attention too."

Track listings

Charts

Uses in pop culture
In 1992, the song was used in the Season One episode of the 1990s action crime drama TV series Street Justice in the episode "Backbeat" where Debbie Gibson made guest appearance in that episode as a singer named Gabrielle.

References

External links
 

1990 singles
1990 songs
Debbie Gibson songs
Songs written by Debbie Gibson
Songs written by Lamont Dozier
Atlantic Records singles
American contemporary R&B songs